Oncogene is a peer-reviewed scientific journal published under the Nature Portfolio addressing cancer cell genetics and the structure and function of oncogenes. The journal has editorial office in London, England under the publishing company Springer Nature. The journal was established in 1987. An open access online-only sister journal, Oncogenesis, was established in 2012 by Douglas R. Green, who was then Oncogene'''s editor-in-chief.Oncogene received a 2021 impact factor of 8.756 and received Journal Citation Reports rankings of 38th out of 245 journals in the category Oncology, 16th out of 175 in the category Genetics & Heredity, 41st out of 194 in the category Cell Biology, and 40th out of 296 in the category Biochemistry & Molecular Biology''.

The current editors-in-chief are George Miller and Justin Stebbing.

Abstracting and indexing 
The journal is abstracted and indexed in:

EBSCO Discovery Service, Google Scholar, OCLC, Summon by ProQuest, BIOSIS, Current Contents/Life Sciences, Science Citation Index, Science Citation Index Expanded (SciSearch), SCOPUS, EBSCO Academic Search, EBSCO Advanced Placement Source, EBSCO Agriculture Plus, EBSCO Biomedical Reference Collection, EBSCO Science & Technology Collection, EBSCO STM Source, EBSCO TOC Premier, and INIS Atomindex.

See also 
Nature Research

List of Nature Research journals

References 

Genetics journals
Oncology journals
English-language journals
Nature Research academic journals
Publications established in 1987
Weekly journals